Wunderwelt Wissen is A weekly television documentary airing on the German television channel ProSieben.

2005 German television series debuts
2007 German television series endings
German documentary television series
ProSieben original programming
German-language television shows